The Banjska River ( / Banjska reka, "Baths River"), is a river in southern Serbia, the right tributary of Toplica in which it flows near Kuršumlija. It rises under the far south-eastern branch of Kopaonik. It is 22 km long, with a river basin area of 155 km². The average flow at the mouth is 0,7 m³/s. The valley of the river is mostly ravines, while the basin is rich in forest. The Kuršumlija-Kuršumlijska Banja-Prepolac Pass-Podujevo-Priština road leads by that valley.

References

Rivers of Serbia
Kuršumlija